Jawan of Vellimala is a 2012 Malayalam film written by James Albert and directed by debutant Anoop Kannan. It stars Mammootty, Sreenivasan, Mamta Mohandas and Asif Ali.

Cast
 Mammootty as Gopikrishnan,retired soldier, Indian Army
 Asif Ali as Koshi Oommen
 Sreenivasan as Varghese
 Mamta Mohandas as Deepa
 Leona Lishoy as Jenny Varghese
 Ann Sheetal as Jenny's friend
 Baburaj as Chacko
 Joji as dam security guard
 Sunil Sukhadha as Ittichan
 Joju George as Vinu
 Kottayam Nazeer as Rafi
 Niyas Backer as Shibu
 Sadiq
 Ranjith as Dr. Shivaprasad (cameo)
 Devan as Lt Col.Rajagopal (cameo)
 Vineeth Sreenivasan as Narrator(Voice-only)

Release and reception

Sify gave the movie a negative review adding "Jawan of Vellimala is a messy tale that can surprise you with its hollowness. An amateurish effort at best, this film is unintentionally funny at times and lacks much fizz." The noted reviewer of Sify Moviebuzz making it clear that the movie collapsed in all aspects and establishes his arguments with several examples, giving the verdict as "below average" and moreover a very amateurish effort at its best.

Rediff.com gave the movie a negative rating of 2 out of 5 stars. Rediff.com critic Paresh C. Palicha furnishes the review heading as "Nothing new in Jawan of Vellimala" and added "At the end, Jawan of Vellimala, which held so much promise in the beginning, just fizzles out."

The Times of India gave the movie a negative rating of 2 out of 5 stars stating "Finally, when it happens, what is intended to be a glorious end, looks plainly dramatic and even a blessed actor like Mammootty fails to shoulder the burden" and concludes with a note "Jawan of Vellimala lacks appeal not because it is predictable, but because of the shocking manner in which it ruins what could have been a promising plot."

indiaglitz gave the movie a rating of 6/10 adding "The execution of 'Jawan of Vellimala' certainly ruins the possibilities of a great movie from a promising plot. But the movie will be fine for a onetime watch, if you don't go with bigger expectations."

Soundtrack

Box office
The film collected around 1710 from 1st weekend from UK box office.

References

External links 
 

2012 films
2010s Malayalam-language films
2012 directorial debut films